Snowboarding is a Paralympic sport that is contested at the Winter Paralympic Games. Snowboarding was first introduced with snowboard cross a part of the Alpine skiing discipline at the 2014 Winter Paralympics in Sochi, Russia. At the 2018 Winter Paralympics in PyeongChang, South Korea, events were held in 2 disciplines — snowboard cross and banked slalom — in 2 categories for women and 3 categories for men.

A total of 12 gold medals, 12 silver medals and 12 bronze medals have been awarded since 2014 and have been won by skiers from 10 National Paralympic Committees (NPC).



Summary

Medal table
The ranking in the table is based on information provided by the International Paralympic Committee (IPC) and will be consistent with IPC convention in its published medal tables. By default, the table will be ordered by the number of gold medals the athletes from a nation have won (in this context, a "nation" is an entity represented by a National Paralympic Committee). The number of silver medals is taken into consideration next and then the number of bronze medals. If nations are still tied, equal ranking is given and they are listed alphabetically by IPC country code.

Last Updated after the 2022 Winter Paralympics

Women

Snowboard cross

Banked slalom

Men

Snowboard cross

Banked slalom

Statistics

Athlete medal leaders

Medals per year

Medal sweep events
These are events where athletes from one nation won all three medals.

See also 
 List of Olympic medalists in snowboarding
 List of Paralympic medalists in alpine skiing
 Lists of Paralympic medalists

References

External links
 IPC Historical Results Database, International Paralympic Committee (IPC)

Alpine skiing
Medalists